René Lacoste defeated Jean Borotra in the final, 6–4, 6–0, 6–4 to win the men's singles tennis title at the 1926 U.S. National Championships. It was Lacoste's first U.S. Championships title and his third major title overall.

Bill Tilden was the six-time defending champion, but was defeated in the quarterfinals by reigning French Championships champion Henri Cochet.

Draw

Final eight

Earlier rounds

References

Men's singles
1926